Juan Castro may refer to:

 Juan Castro, Mexican baseball player
 Juan Castro (bishop), Colombian bishop
 Juan Castro (footballer), Mexican footballer
 Juan Alberto Castro, Argentine footballer
 Juan José Castro, Argentine composer
 Juan Pablo Castro, Argentine rugby union player
 Juan de Castro, Spanish bishop and cardinal
 Juan de Castro (bishop of Taranto), Italian bishop